Jesper Hansen (born 23 October 1990) is a Danish former professional cyclist, who rode professionally between 2011 and 2021 for six different teams.

Career
In 2014 he received the Young rider classification jersey at the Tour of Norway, for being the best rider under 25 years of age in the overall classification standings.

While riding the Tour de Romandie, he slammed into the door of a medical car. The door was carelessly opened and knocked Hansen down. While appearing injured at first, he ultimately soldiered on and continued the race. He was named in the start list for the 2015 Vuelta a España, the 2017 Giro d'Italia, and the 2018 Tour de France.

After Hansen's contract was not renewed by  after the 2020 season, he initially considered retirement. However, which was forced to step down from UCI ProTeam to UCI Continental level due to financial difficulties, signed Hansen to a one-year contract for the 2021 season, which the two parties had previously agreed upon once the team secured their financial standing. He retired following the season, ending his career with two professional victories.

Major results

2013
 2nd Hadeland GP
 6th Overall Circuit des Ardennes
 6th Overall Tour de Normandie
 7th Overall Tour of Norway
2014
 6th Overall Tour of Norway
1st  Young rider classification
2015
 1st  Overall Tour of Norway
1st Stage 3
 6th Overall Tour de Langkawi
2016
 2nd Overall Tour of Croatia
1st Stage 5 (TTT)
 5th Overall Tour de Langkawi
 10th Overall Abu Dhabi Tour
2017
 2nd Overall Tour of Turkey
 9th Overall Tour of Croatia
2018
 9th Overall Volta a Catalunya
2019
 7th Overall Tour of California

Grand Tour general classification results timeline

References

External links

1990 births
Living people
Danish male cyclists
Cyclists from Copenhagen